BBI may refer to:

 Biju Patnaik Airport (IATA code: BBI) in Bhubaneswar, India
 Berlin-Brandenburg International Airport in Germany
 Blockbuster Inc. (NYSE ticker: BBI) 
 Building Bridges Initiative, an attempted constitutional referendum in Kenya
 Burton Blatt Institute, research institute at Syracuse University
 , Federal Public Service of Belgium.
 Black, Brown, and Indigenous; see BIPOC